Juan Antonio Bardem Muñoz (2 June 1922 – 30 October 2002) was a Spanish film director and screen writer, born in Madrid. He was a member of the Communist Party. Bardem was best known for Muerte de un ciclista (1955) which won the FIPRESCI Prize at the 1955 Cannes Film Festival, and El puente (1977) which won the Golden Prize at the 10th Moscow International Film Festival. His 1979 film Seven Days in January won the Golden Prize at the 11th Moscow International Film Festival. In 1981 he was a member of the jury at the 12th Moscow International Film Festival. In 1993 he was a member of the jury at the 43rd Berlin International Film Festival. In 1953 he and Luis García Berlanga founded a film magazine, Objetivo, which existed until 1956. Bardem is the father of director Miguel Bardem and uncle of actor Javier Bardem. Bardem died in Madrid in 2002, at age 80.

Filmography

Director 
Esa pareja feliz (1951, co-directed with Luis García Berlanga)
Cómicos (1954)
Felices pascuas (1954)
Death of a Cyclist (1955)
Calle Mayor (1956)
Vengeance (1957)
Sonatas (1959)
At Five O'Clock in the Afternoon (1961)
Los inocentes (1963)
Nunca pasa nada (1963)
Los pianos mecánicos (1965)
El último día de la guerra (1968)
 Variety (1971)
La corrupción de Chris Miller (1973)
La isla misteriosa y el capitán Nemo (1973) (TV miniseries)
El puente (1977)
El Perro (1977)
Siete días de enero (1979) about the 1977 Atocha massacre
Lorca, muerte de un poeta (1987) (TV miniseries)
El joven Picasso (1993)
Resultado final (1997)

Screenwriter 
Welcome Mr. Marshall! (1953)
Don Juan (1956)
A Bell from Hell (1973)
La Isla Misteriosa (1973)

References

External links
 
 Death of Cyclist (Muerte de un ciclista): program note from 1957 San Francisco International Film Festival website

1922 births
2002 deaths
Film directors from Madrid
Spanish communists
Spanish male screenwriters
Spanish male writers
Honorary Goya Award winners
Writers from Madrid
Spanish magazine founders
Juan Antonio
20th-century screenwriters